P37 or P-37 may refer to:

 Curtiss YP-37, an American prototype fighter aircraft
 , a submarine of the Royal Navy sold for scrap in 1949
 , a submarine of the Royal Navy lost in 1942
 Papyrus 37, a biblical manuscript
 Phosphorus-37, an isotope of phosphorus
 PZL.37 Łoś, a Polish medium bomber